Zaanse Schans is a neighbourhood of Zaandam, near Zaandijk, Netherlands. It is best known for its collection of windmills and wooden houses that were relocated here from the wider region north of Amsterdam for preservation. From 1961 to 1974, old buildings from all over the region known as the Zaanstreek were relocated using lowboy trailers to the Zaanse Schans. Two of the windmills in the Zaanse Schans are preserved in their original site where they were first constructed, and therefore don't make up part of the relocated structures. The Zaans Museum, established in 1994, near the first Zaanse Schans windmill, is located south of the neighbourhood. This architectural reserve for Zaanse timber construction is a protected village scene because of its architectural-historical and landscape value. It developed into an international tourist destination with several million visitors every year: in 2016, there were 1.8 million, in 2017 – 2.2 million.

Etymology and history
Zaanse Schans derived its name from the river Zaan and its original function as sconce (schans in Dutch) against the Spanish troops during the Eighty Years' War of Dutch independence.

Attractions
Zaanse Schans is a popular tourist attraction and an anchor point of the European Route of Industrial Heritage (ERIH). The neighbourhood attracted approximately 1.6 million visitors in 2014. It is served by Zaandijk Zaanse Schans railway station, 18 minutes away from Amsterdam Centraal station.

The Zaanse Schans houses seven museums — the Weavers House, the Cooperage, the Jisper House, Zaan Time Museum, Albert Heijn Museum Shop and the Bakery Museum. The whole neighbourhood is a popular tourist attraction and there is a debate in local politics on how to reduce overcrowding.

List of windmills
The windmills were built after 1574. 

 De Huisman (The Houseman), a mustardmill
 De Gekroonde Poelenburg (The Crowned Poelenburg), a sawmill
 De Kat (The Cat), a dyemill
 Het Jonge Schaap (The Young Sheep), a sawmill
 De Os (The Ox), an oilmill
 De Zoeker (The Seeker), an oilmill 
 Het Klaverblad (The Cloverleaf), a sawmill
 De Bonte Hen (The Spotted Hen), an oilmill

See also 
 Wind pump

References

External links

 

Museums in North Holland
Open-air museums in the Netherlands
Populated places in North Holland
Windmills in North Holland
Zaandam